Rourkela is the educational, technical and medical research hub of Western Odisha. It houses many English medium schools which provide Central Board of Secondary Education and Indian Certificate of Secondary Education certificates to their students.

The students of these schools represent their schools in various national level and international competitions including IMO, IChO and NASA. Rourkela also houses one of the premier institutes of the country, NIT Rourkela.

There are overall 15 colleges for arts, science and commerce streams under the Sambalpur university. There are also private engineering colleges Padmanava (PCE), Rourkela Institute of Management Studies (RIMS), DAMITS, RIT. This colleges come under the jurisdiction of Biju Pattnaik University of Technology (BPUT) and the head office is located in Rourkela.

Secondary and High Schools
 Guru Nanak Public School, Rourkela, (English medium) Sector-21,Nayabazar Rourkela-1
 Ispat High School
St Gregorios higher secondary school Rourkela
Chinmaya Vidyalaya, Chhend (English Medium)
Dr.A.N.K DAV Public School, Basanti Colony
Deepika English Medium School, Rourkela, Sector - 5
Delhi Public School, Rourkela, Sector-14, Rourkela
Desouza's School, Sector-2
Loreto English School, civil township, Rourkela

Indo English School, Bisra Dahar Road, Rourkela
Ispat English Medium SchoolSchool  , Sector - 20
Kendriya Vidyalaya Rourkela, Sector-6
M.G.M English Medium School, Jhirpani.
Mount Carmel Convent School, Hamirpur
Saraswati Vidya Mandir, Birsa Dahar Road (English Medium)
St Joseph's Convent School, Hamirpur
St Paul's School, Rourkela
Uditnagar Government High School
Pragati Vidya Mandir, Jagda, Rourkela-42 (It was previously the home of the Deutsche Schule Rourkela, a German school.)

Engineering and management colleges
 National Institute of Technology, Rourkela
 Padmanava College of Engineering, Rourkela, Sector-4
 Rourkela Institute of Management Studies, Chhend
 Rourkela Institute of Technology, Kalunga
 S.K.D.A.V. Polytechnic For Women, Basanti Colony.
 Utkalmani Gopabandhu Institute of Engineering, Rourkela
 Kanak Manjari Institute of Pharmaceutical Sciences, Chhend
 Purusottam Institute Of Engineering and Technology Madiakudar Rourkela

General colleges
 Sushilavati Government Women's College, Rourkela
 Municipal College
 Government College, Panposh
 Ispat Autonomous College, Rourkela
College of Teacher Education, Rourkela

Medical and pharmacy colleges
 Kanak Manjari Institute of Pharmaceutical Sciences, Chhend
 Hi-Tech Medical College a Bhubaneswar-based institution is under construction at Civil Township, Rourkela

Universities
 Biju Patnaik University of Technology
 National Institute of Technology, Rourkela

Sports 
 Sail Hockey Academy, Biju Patnaik Hockey Stadium
 Panposh Sports Hostel, Panposh

See also 

List of schools and colleges in Rourkela

References